Joseph-Jean-Baptiste Gosselin (November 22, 1848 – May 16, 1929) was a merchant and political figure in Quebec. He represented Missisquoi in the Legislative Assembly of Quebec from 1900 to 1919 as a Liberal.

He was born in Saint-Athanase, Canada East, the son of François Gosselin and Onésime Nadeau. Gosselin married Rose-de-Lima Gauthier in 1878. In 1886, he established a general store at Notre-Dame-de-Stanbridge. He also operated a spinning mill and was involved in the export of hay. Gosselin was president of the school board and served as mayor of Notre-Dame-de-Stanbridge. In 1919, he was named to the Legislative Council of Quebec for Bedford division. Gosselin died in office in Notre-Dame-de-Stanbridge at the age of 80.

His brother François also served in the Quebec assembly.

External links
 

Quebec Liberal Party MNAs
Mayors of places in Quebec
Quebec Liberal Party MLCs
1848 births
1929 deaths
People from Saint-Jean-sur-Richelieu